Adalberto Eliécer Carrasquilla Alcázar (born 28 November 1998) is a Panamanian professional footballer who plays as a midfielder for Major League Soccer club Houston Dynamo and the Panama national team.

Club career

Tauro 
Carrasquilla began his career with Tauro FC in his hometown of Panama City.  He made his first team debut on 29 March 2015 during a 1–0 loss to Árabe Unido in a Liga Panameña de Fútbol match at just 16 years old.  He scored his first goal on 22 April 2016 to give Tauro a 2–1 win over Árabe Unido.  During 5 seasons playing for Tauro, Carrasquilla helped them win the 2017 Clausura and 2018 Apertura league titles.

FC Cartagena
On 12 August 2019 it was confirmed that Carrasquilla had been loaned out to FC Cartagena, who at the time were playing in Segunda División B, the Spanish third-tier, for the rest of 2019 with an option to buy. He made his debut for Cartagena on 15 September, coming off the bench in a 1–0 win over Atlético Sanluqueño.  On 29 November 2019, Cartagena announced that they had triggered Carrasquilla's purchase option for €300,000 and signed him to a new contract until 2025. Carrasquilla made 20 appearances in all competitions during his first season in Spain, helping Cartagena win promotion to the Segunda División after 8 seasons in the third tier.

He scored his first goal for Cartagena on 24 October 2020 in a 3–0 win against UD Las Palmas.  After playing regularly for the first half of the season Cartagena brought in a new head coach in January, Luis Carrión.  Carrasquilla featured less frequently over the latter half of the season.  He made 28 appearances and scored 1 goal in league play as Cartagena finished 16th in the table, 3 spots and 3 points above the relegation zone.

Houston Dynamo 
On 5 August 2021, Carrasquilla joined MLS side Houston Dynamo on loan.  He made his Dynamo debut on 7 August, coming on as a substitute in a 2–0 loss to Minnesota United.  He scored his first goal on 28 August in a 2–1 loss to Minnesota United.  Carrasquilla ended the season with 10 appearances and 1 goal as Houston finished last in the Western Conference, missing out on the playoffs. 

On 10 May 2022, activated their purchase option on Carrasquilla's loan, making his move to the Dynamo permanent.  The official transfer fee was undisclosed, but was reportedly close to $2 million.  Carrasquilla scored his first goal of the season on 14 May in a 2–0 win over Nashville SC.  He finished the season with 2 goals and 4 assists in 32 appearances, but Houston failed to qualify for the playoffs again, finishing 13th in the conference.

International career
Carrasquilla made his debut for the Panama national team on 17 April 2018, coming off the bench in a 1–0 win over Trinidad and Tobago.

On 14 May 2018, he was called up the  Panama national team for the preliminary 35-man squad for the 2018 FIFA World Cup but was not named in the final 23.

Carrasquilla scored his first goal for Panama on 8 September 2019 in a 4–1 victory against Bermuda in the CONCACAF Nations League.

On 1 July 2021, he was named to head coach Thomas Christiansen 23-man squad for the 2021 CONCACAF Gold Cup.  Carrasquilla started all 3 games and had an assist as Panama finished 3rd in their group.

Career statistics

Club

International

International goals
Scores and results list Panama's goal tally first.

Honours 
Tauro

 Liga Panameña de Fútbol: 2017 Clausura, 2018 Apertura

References

External links

1998 births
Living people
Panamanian footballers
Panamanian expatriate footballers
Panama international footballers
Liga Panameña de Fútbol players
Segunda División B players
Tauro F.C. players
FC Cartagena footballers
Houston Dynamo FC players
Association football midfielders
Expatriate footballers in Spain
Expatriate soccer players in the United States
Panamanian expatriate sportspeople in Spain
Panamanian expatriate sportspeople in the United States
Panama youth international footballers
Sportspeople from Panama City
2021 CONCACAF Gold Cup players
Major League Soccer players